The year 582 BC was a year of the pre-Julian Roman calendar. In the Roman Empire, it was known as year 172 Ab urbe condita. The denomination 582 BC for this year has been used since the early medieval period, when the Anno Domini calendar era became the prevalent method in Europe for naming years.

Events
The Pythian Games are reorganized at Delphi, with Cleisthenes of Sicyon winning the chariot race.
The Isthmian Games are established.
In a second wave of Greek colonization, Akragas on Sicily is founded.
Nebuchadnezzar forces a third deportation of Jews from Judah into Babylonian captivity.

Births

Deaths
Duke Qing of Qi, ruler of the State of Qi
Emperor Jimmu, the first Emperor of Japan

References